Cramp balls is the common name for at least two genii of fungus: 
 Daldinia concentrica 
 Annulohypoxylon or annulohypoxylon thouarsianum